A. ovata  may refer to:
 Agathis ovata, a conifer species found only in New Caledonia
 Antonia ovata, a plant species

See also